Lifepod is a 1993 television film reworking of the Alfred Hitchcock film Lifeboat. It starred Ron Silver, Robert Loggia, Kelli Williams & C. C. H. Pounder, with Silver also directing. It aired on Fox Network in June 1993. Lifepod moved the action from an ocean-bound lifeboat on Earth to a spacecraft's escape pod, with the characters the survivors of a sabotaged spacecraft.

Plot
On Christmas Eve 2169 AD, a ship traveling through space suffers a critical malfunction. Eight passengers and crew escape to a lifepod, just before the spaceship explodes, killing all others on board.

The survivors attempt to broadcast a distress signal and wait for rescue. As the days wear on, the lifepod suffers a series of setbacks and malfunctions: air and heat become limited, along with food and potable water. As supplies dwindle, the survivors debate how to conserve their supplies and whether they should prematurely end the life of a critically injured survivor who is consuming a disproportionate amount of supplies.

One morning, the survivors wake up to discover their critically injured crewmate dead. The survivors realize there is a killer hiding among them on the lifepod. Eventually the survivors realize that it's possible that one of the people in the Lifepod could have sabotaged the spacecraft, and who wouldn't balk at killing the others to keep themselves alive.

Cast

 Robert Loggia ............. Director Banks
 Jessica Tuck .............. Claire St. John
 Stan Shaw.................. Parker
 Adam Storke ............... Kane
 Kelli Williams............. Rena Jahnusia
 Ed Gale ............... Q-Three
 CCH Pounder ........... Mayvene
 Ron Silver..................Terman

Reception
In Creature Feature, the movie got 3 1/2 stars out of 5, praising the pacing and the effects. Variety liked the opening sequence and found that Silver mixes action and characters well enough to emphasize their specialties, but not their individuality and that the movie was overall just OK.

Production

This was the first time Silver had directed a movie. Produced by Trilogy Entertainment and Pen Densham. Designed as a homage to Lifeboat, not a remake.

References

External links

 

American space adventure films
Remakes of American films
1993 television films
1993 films
American science fiction television films
Fox network original films
1990s science fiction films
Films set in the 22nd century
Films scored by Mark Mancina
1990s American films